The People's Party of Asturias (PP) is the regional section of the People's Party of Spain (PP) in the Principality of Asturias. It was formed in 1989 from the re-foundation of the People's Alliance.

Electoral performance

General Junta of the Principality of Asturias

Cortes Generales

European Parliament

Notes

References

People's Party (Spain)
Political parties in Asturias